Lower Arroyo is a neighborhood in Pasadena, California, centered on the Arroyo Seco south of Brookside Park. It is bordered by Holly Street to the north, Columbia Street to the south, San Rafael Avenue to the west, and Orange Grove Boulevard to the east.

Landmarks
Lower Arroyo's most notable landmark is the Colorado Street Bridge over the Arroyo Seco. The neighborhood also houses the headquarters of the United States 9th Circuit Court of Appeals.

The area at the floor of the Arroyo Seco, along both sides of the flood control channel (between Arroyo Blvd. on the east and San Rafael Ave. on the west, from the Colorado Street bridge to the South Pasadena border) is known locally as Lower Arroyo Park, and identified as such by a sign posted at the entrance near the intersection of Arroyo and Norwood Street. The City of Pasadena's website identifies it only as "Lower Arroyo Seco." The park, which covers about 150 acres, includes several miles of hiking trails.

Features of the Lower Arroyo:

Fly casting pond and clubhouse

Archery range

Multi-use trails (hiking, dog-walking, jogging)

The La Casita del Arroyo community center

The Aids Memorial Grove

Bird Sanctuary

Education
Lower Arroyo is served by San Rafael and Cleveland Elementary Schools, Blair Middle School, and Blair High School. Mayfield Senior High School is a private school in the area.

Transportation
Lower Arroyo is served by Metro Local lines 180 and 256; as well as Pasadena ARTS route 70, though none of these routes comes closer than about a mile from the Lower Arroyo.

Government
Lower Arroyo, from Colorado Blvd. to the city's southern border, is contained within District 6, represented by Steve Madison. North of Colorado, the western side is in District 6 and the eastern side is in District 1, represented by Tyron Hampton.

References

Neighborhoods in Pasadena, California